Relentless may refer to:

Film 
 Relentless (1948 film), an American film directed by George Sherman
 Relentless, a 1977 American television film starring Will Sampson
 Relentless (1989 film), an American crime film starring Judd Nelson, followed by several sequels
 Relentless: The Struggle for Peace in the Middle East, a 2003 Israeli documentary film
 Relentless (2010 film), a Nigerian film starring Nneka Egbuna and Jimmy Jean-Louis

Games 
 Relentless Software, developers of the Buzz! series of quiz video games
 Relentless: Twinsen's Adventure or Little Big Adventure, a 1994 video game

Literature 
 Relentless (Greaney novel), a 2021 novel in the Gray Man series by Mark Greaney
 Relentless (Kernick novel), a 2006 crime novel by Simon Kernick
 Relentless (Koontz novel), a 2009 thriller novel by Dean Koontz
 Relentless: The True Story of the Man Behind Rogers Communications, a 2008 autobiography by Ted Rogers
 The Lost Fleet: Relentless, a 2009 novel in the Lost Fleet series by John Campbell

Music

Albums 
 Relentless (For the Fallen Dreams album), 2009
 Relentless (Jackyl album), 2002
 Relentless (Jason Aldean album), or the title song (see below), 2007
 Relentless (Jo O'Meara album), 2005
 Relentless (Mortification album), 2003
 Relentless (Natalie Grant album), 2008
 Relentless (Pentagram album), 1985
Relentless, a portion of the double album version of the 1993 release of the Pet Shop Boys album Very, 1993
 Relentless (Yngwie Malmsteen album), 2010
 Relentless, a 2009 album by Young MC
 Relentless EP, a 2007 EP by Malefice
 Relentless, gospel reggae album by Sherwin Gardner

Record labels 
 Relentless Records, a Quebec record label

Songs 
 "Relentless" (Jason Aldean song), 2008
 "Relentless" (Sick of It All song), 2003
 "Relentless", by Arkells from Rally Cry
 "Relentless", by Hillsong United
 "Relentless", by Little River Band from Playing to Win
 "Relentless", by Raven from Architect of Fear
 "Relentless", by The Stranglers from Suite XVI
 "Relentless", by Strapping Young Lad from Strapping Young Lad

Other uses 
 Relentless (Bill Hicks album), a 1992 comedy album
 Relentless (drink), an energy drink manufactured by Coca-Cola
 Relentless Suzuki, an alternative name for TAS Racing, an international road racing team from Northern Ireland 
 USNS Relentless (T-AGOS-18), a 1989 U.S. Navy surveillance ship